Jerrott Michael Willard (born July 11, 1972) is a former professional American football linebacker in the National Football League. He attended University of California, Berkeley. He would play in one game for the Kansas City Chiefs in 1998.

College career

Jerrott Willard was noted by the California Sports Hall of Fame as "one of the most prolific tacklers in Cal history." While playing with the California Golden Bears over 4 seasons, he would set a school record for tackles for loss (54), which has since been broken.

Professional career 

Following his college career, Willard was taken in the fifth round of the 1994 NFL Draft by the Kansas City Chiefs. Limited by injuries, he would play in one game for the team in 1998.

References

External links
Pro-Football reference
California Athletics Hall of Fame website

1972 births
Living people
Players of American football from California
Sportspeople from Fullerton, California
Sportspeople from Newport Beach, California
American football linebackers
California Golden Bears football players
Kansas City Chiefs players